Owch Hacha Rural District is in the Central District of Ahar County, East Azerbaijan province, Iran. At the census of 2006, its population was 5,286 in 1,158 households; there were 4,670 inhabitants in 1,209 households at the following census of 2011; and in the most recent census of 2016, the population of the rural district was 4,407 in 1,318 households. The largest of its 28 villages was Zandabad, with 975 people.

References 

Ahar County

Rural Districts of East Azerbaijan Province

Populated places in East Azerbaijan Province

Populated places in Ahar County